Manuel Crivelli (born 18 October 1993) is an Argentine handball player for Cavigal Nice Handball and the Argentine national team.

He represented Argentina at the 2019 World Men's Handball Championship.

References

1993 births
Living people
Argentine male handball players
21st-century Argentine people